Continental Hockey League is a name used by several hockey leagues.

 Kontinental Hockey League or Континентальная Хоккейная Лига (est. 2008), an international ice hockey league that replaced the Russian Super League (1996–2008)
 Continental Hockey League (1972–1986), an ice hockey league replaced by All-American Hockey League (1986–1989)
 Continental Elite Hockey League, a former independent junior hockey league
 Continental Hockey Association, a former Tier 3 junior ice hockey league, frequently called the Continental Hockey League

See also
 CHL (disambiguation)